Yula Beeri, born Yuli Yael Be'eri, is an Israeli composer, musician, and performer. She has been performing music in New York City for the past ten years.

Yula is the founder of the music and arts collective Yula & The Extended Family (YXFM), an ever-morphing poetic tribe based at The Hive NYC in Brooklyn. The group's members not only produce music but also theater, film, photography, painting, literature, and dance.
Yula's current projects include electronic trio "Kiss Slash Crooked Smile" (Assf Spector and Stefano Baldasseroni), "Hydra Vocal Trio" (Sarah Small and Rima Fand) and "Yula and The Extended Family"

Yula's current projects include; “Yula and The Extended Family” with husband/ drummer Isaac Gardner featuring guest performers Stefan Zenuik, Yuval Semo, Shahar Mintz, and Omer Wald, “ReAl ZeRo” (Willey)

and “Seasonal Beast” (Yuval Semo)

Yula is also the former bassist and music writer for The World Inferno Friendship Society, Nanuchka, and Star Fucking Hipsters. Her collaborations include working with Brian Viglione of The Dresden Dolls, Franz Nicolay of The Hold Steady, Tamir Muskat of Balkan Beatbox, Stefan Zeniuk of Gato Loco, Roy Gurel of Electro Morocco, Shlomi Lavie of Marcy Playground, Taylor Galassi of This Way to the Egress, Torcher Chamber, and many others.

She recently became the lead singer in Yuval Semo's Seasonal Beast.
She currently plays with Yula and the Extended Family based at The Hive NYC in Brooklyn, New York.

References

http://www.thedowntowndiaries.com/2010/03/whats-goin-down-the-small-beast-at-the-delancey/
http://www.autostraddle.com/sxsw-2010-captains-log-4-because-i-got-high/

External links
 http://www.yulabeeri.com/
yula be'eri facebook
 http://www.last.fm/music/Yula+and+the+eXtended+Family

Living people
21st-century Israeli women musicians
Year of birth missing (living people)
Israeli rock singers
Star Fucking Hipsters members